Oliver Llewellyn Pitcher (born 27 May 1983) is a Bermudian cricketer. He was a right-handed batsman and a right-arm medium pace bowler. He played five One Day Internationals and three Twenty20 Internationals for Bermuda, including three appearances at the 2007 Cricket World Cup.

References

External links

1983 births
Living people
Bermudian cricketers
Bermuda One Day International cricketers
Bermuda Twenty20 International cricketers